The News Broadcasters & Digital Association (NBDA) formerly known as the News Broadcasters Association (NBA) is a private association of different current affairs and news television broadcasters in India. It was established by leading Indian news broadcasters on 3 July 2007.  The Association was set up to deal with ethical, operational, regulatory, technical and legal issues affecting news and current-affairs channels.

In August 2021, News Broadcasters Association was renamed as News Broadcasters & Digital Association after inclusion of digital media news broadcasters in the association.

Membership 
Membership to the association is governed by qualifying certain guidelines. Besides this, an annual subscription fee has also to be paid by the applicant/member. The Association as on date has 27 members representing 70 channels.

News Broadcasting & Digital Standards Authority
News Broadcasting & Digital Standards Authority is an independent body set up by the News Broadcasters & Digital Association. NBDSA was created to consider and adjudicate upon complaints about broadcasts.

Controversies 
NBA Board Members, who are linked to various Print and Electronic Media outlet, were accused by many of adopting double standards, as they immediately called for closure of TRP scam case investigation by Central Bureau of Investigation in a FIR filed in UP in Oct, 2020, which could have possibly highlighted involvement of many of the member channels role in the scam. However, many of the members had earlier given wide coverage to the TRP scam case accusing a rival channel Republic TV of TRP fudging, when investigation was launched in the TRP scam by the Mumbai Police accusing Republic TV.

Members
Its founding members of NBA were
 Global Broadcast News Ltd.  
 Independent News Service Pvt. Ltd.  
 Media Content & Communication Service (India) Ltd.  
 New Delhi Television Ltd.  
 Television Eighteen India Ltd.  
 Times Global Broadcasting Company Ltd.  
 T.V. Today Network Ltd.  
 Zee News Ltd.

Board members of NBDA in year 2019-20
The Office Bearers of NBA for the year 2019-20 are :

1. Rajat Sharma – President (Chairman & Editor-in-Chief (India TV) – Independent News Service Pvt. Ltd.)

2. I. Venkat - Vice President (Director - Eenadu Television Pvt. Ltd.)

3.   Anuradha Prasad Shukla – Honorary Treasurer (Chairperson-cum-Managing Director, News24 Broadcast India Ltd.)

The other Members on the NBA Board are:

4.   M.K. Anand, Managing Director & Chief Executive Officer – Times Network - Bennett, Coleman & Co. Ltd.

5. M.V. Shreyams Kumar, Joint Managing Director, Mathrubhumi Printing & Publishing Co. Ltd.

6.   Rahul Joshi, CEO News & Group Editor-in-Charge - TV18 Broadcast Ltd.

7.  Avinash Pandey, Chief Operating Officer - ABP News Network Pvt. Ltd.

8.  Kalli Purie Bhandal, Vice-chairperson & Managing Director - TV Today Network Ltd.

9.  Sonia Singh, editorial director, NDTV - New Delhi Television Ltd.

10. Sudhir Chaudhary, chief executive officer - Cluster 1, Aaj Tak Ltd.

References

External links
  
Indian journalism organisations
Organizations established in 2008
Television organisations in India
Broadcasting authorities